Carlos Eduardo "Edu" Peppe Britos (born 28 January 1983) is an Uruguayan-born Andorran international footballer who plays for UE Sant Julià in Primera Divisió, as a midfielder. Besides Uruguay, he has played in Andorra.

Career
Peppe began his senior career at Defensor Sporting in 2002, moving to Cerrito in 2005. He signed for Sant Julià in 2007.

He made his international debut for Andorra in 2011.

References

External links

Edu Peppe at La Preferente

1983 births
Living people
Footballers from Montevideo
Uruguayan emigrants to Andorra
Andorran people of Uruguayan descent
Sportspeople of Uruguayan descent
Andorran footballers
Andorra international footballers
Defensor Sporting players
Sportivo Cerrito players
UE Sant Julià players
FC Andorra players
FC Encamp players
UE Engordany players
Primera Divisió players
Association football midfielders
Expatriate footballers in Spain